Geophilus bluncki is a species of soil centipede in the family Geophilidae found in San Remo, Italy. It grows up to 23 millimeters in length; the males have about 61 leg pairs. The uniform pore fields and long antennae resemble Arctogeophilus glacialis, formerly Geophilus glacialis.

References

bluncki
Zoology